Grigoryevka is a rural locality (a selo) in Dalnevostochny Selsoviet of Romnensky District, Amur Oblast, Russia. The population was 77 as of 2018. There are 2 streets.

Geography 
Grigoryevka is located 53 km southwest of Romny (the district's administrative centre) by road. Vysokoye and Dalnevostochnoye are the nearest rural localities.

References 

Rural localities in Romnensky District